The 7th PGA Golden Laurel Awards, honoring the best film and television producers of 1995, were held at the Regent Beverly Wilshire Hotel in Los Angeles, California on March 6, 1996.

Winners and nominees

Film

Television

Special

References

 1995
1995 film awards
1995 television awards